The 2022 Yale Bulldogs football team represented Yale University as a member of the Ivy League during the 2022 NCAA Division I FCS football season. The team was led by tenth-year head coach Tony Reno and played its home games at the Yale Bowl.

Previous season

The Bulldogs finished the 2021 season with a record of 5–5, 4–3 Ivy League play to finish in a tie for fourth place.

Schedule

Game summaries

at No. 13 Holy Cross

at Cornell

Howard

Dartmouth

Bucknell

at Penn

at Columbia

Brown

No. 24 Princeton

at Harvard

References

Yale
Yale Bulldogs football seasons
Ivy League football champion seasons
Yale Bulldogs football